Political literacy is a set of abilities considered necessary for citizens to participate in a society's government.

It includes an understanding of how government works and of the important issues facing society, as well as the critical thinking skills to evaluate different points of view.  Many organizations interested in participatory democracy are concerned about political literacy.

The proposition is that most Americans are politically illiterate, where "political literacy" is a set of abilities, skill, knowledge, and proficiency considered necessary for citizens to participate in a society's government.

"Participating in a democratic government" includes the following:
1. Voting for elected representatives at all levels of government from local to state and federal government enterprises.
2. Attending public meetings, aka, "town halls," to ask questions and obtain information first-hand.
3. Studying and evaluating elected candidate resumes and credentials.
4. Studying and understanding the jobs that are filled by elected officials.
5. Offering suggestions for laws and regulations, including amendments.
6. Reviewing plans, programs, budgets, and schedules that affect taxation.

Presumptions in the American Political System include:
1. The Rule of Law
2. The Universal Right to Vote
3. The Universal Declaration of Human Rights
4. The US Constitution

The "Rule of Law" restricts the arbitrary exercise of power by subordinating it to well-defined and established laws.

The Universal Right to Vote is called "suffrage" (also called the universal franchise, general suffrage, and ordinary person's common suffrage). It means giving the right to vote to all adult citizens, regardless of wealth, income, gender, social status, race, ethnicity, or any other restriction, subject only to relatively minor exceptions.

In a democratic republic such as the United States of America, the accepted practice is for everyone to vote. Some voters are better educated than others. That means that election results are the product of the average consensus. A better educated and informed electorate presumably produces a better government. If more uneducated and uninformed voters participate, the average drops, and the result is a more deficient government.

Therefore, one of society's goals is to raise education and information among the electorate. However, some people and politicians prefer to exploit voter ignorance and deficiencies for personal gain at the expense of better governance.

The rule of law implies all are intended to be understood and comprehend by everyone under the principle that ignorance of the law is no excuse.

One of the many challenges in American democracy is supporting citizens by ensuring they have sufficient time and opportunity to engage their responsibilities as citizens. How much time does a citizen voter need to engage their responsibility for self-governance?

To answer that question requires attention to a hierarchy of other questions:

What does it take to ensure a good life for a given citizen and their responsibilities?
1. Is there a deficit or deficiency between what is essential for sustainable living and present life circumstances?
2. If there are deficiencies, what is required to address them?
3. How much discretionary time is available to attend to voter-citizen responsibilities?
4. How much time and commitment is needed to be a responsible citizen?
5. What is necessary to sustain or improve skill, knowledge, and proficiency deficiencies and needs?

References 

 How to Select an American President by James A. George and James A. Rodger (c) 2017 Archway Publishing, https://www.amazon.com/Select-American-President-James-George/dp/1480840882

Political terminology
Literacy